Gada or Gadha may refer to:

Gada, Clara
Gada, Helena
Gadha, Nepal, a village development committee in Siraha District, Nepal
Gadha (album), a 1998 album by Chandrabindoo
Gadaa, an Oromo self-governance system
Garha/GADA, a Jain caste of India
Gada (mace), a club from the Indian subcontinent
Gadā, the pen name of a Chaghatay poet

See also 
 Gada River (disambiguation)